In the mathematics of probability, a transition kernel or kernel is a function in mathematics that has different applications. Kernels can for example be used to define random measures or stochastic processes. The most important example of kernels are the Markov kernels.

Definition 
Let ,  be two measurable spaces. A function

For any fixed , the mapping

is -measurable;
For every fixed , the mapping

Classification of transition kernels 
Transition kernels are usually classified by the measures they define. Those measures are defined as

with

for all  and all . With this notation, the kernel  is called
 a substochastic kernel, sub-probability kernel or a sub-Markov kernel if all  are sub-probability measures
 a Markov kernel, stochastic kernel or probability kernel if all  are probability measures
 a finite kernel if all  are finite measures
 a -finite kernel if all  are -finite measures
 a s-finite kernel is a kernel that can be written as a countable sum of finite kernels

Operations 

Product of kernels

Definition 
Then the product  of the two kernels is defined as

for all .

Properties and comments 
The product of kernels is also associative, meaning it satisfies 

for any three suitable s-finite kernels .

This is equivalent to setting

for all  and all .

Composition of kernels

Definition 
Then the composition  of the two kernels is defined as

for all  and all .

Properties and comments 
The composition of kernels is associative, meaning it satisfies 

for any three suitable s-finite kernels .

An alternative notation is for the composition is

Kernels as operators 

given by

The composition of these operators is compatible with the composition of kernels, meaning

References 

Probability theory